A puzzle globe (also called jigsaw globe, globe puzzle, puzzle ball, puzzle sphere or spherical puzzle) is a spherical assembly of puzzle pieces that, when put together, form a complete sphere or globe. Puzzle globes will generally have a one-piece spherical substrate that supports the puzzle pieces as they are laid in place. In some puzzle globes the substrate is steel and the puzzle pieces are magnetic, the magnetic attraction keeping pieces on the lower portion of the sphere from falling off.

Like a two-dimensional jigsaw puzzle, a globe puzzle is often made of cardboard and the assembled pieces form a single layer. Most globe puzzles have designs representing spherical shapes such as the Earth, the Moon, or historical globes of the Earth.

The logo of Wikipedia is a puzzle globe depicting glyphs from many different writing systems.

A jigsaw puzzle globe from the 1870s is in the collection of the Whipple Museum of the History of Science, and is a copy of an earlier one made in Germany.

See also
 Tetrisphere

References 

Tiling puzzles
Mechanical puzzles
Globes
Jigsaw puzzles